Hammick is a surname. Notable people with the surname include:

Dalziel Hammick (1887–1966), English research chemist
Georgina Hammick (1939–2023), English writer 
Sir Murray Hammick (1854–1936), Indian civil servant and administrator

See also
Hammick baronets, a title in the Baronetage of the United Kingdom created 1834 
Hammick reaction, named after Dalziel Hammick, a chemical reaction